Fenpentadiol (INN) (brand names Tredum, Trefenum; developmental code name Rd-292), also known as phenpentanediol, is a drug described as a tranquilizer and antidepressant that was formerly marketed in Europe. It also has stimulant, sedative, and anxiolytic effects, with the latter two occurring only at higher doses.

The following literature incidence of the fenpentadiol has been found and quoted:

References

Antidepressants
Chloroarenes
Diols
Drugs with unknown mechanisms of action